The 2016 Mazda Road to Indy Shootout was the first edition of the Road to Indy Shootout. The event was held at Mazda Raceway Laguna Seca on December 6 and 7. The winner received a $200,000 scholarship to compete in the 2017 U.S. F2000 National Championship.

Entry list

Notes
 Neil Verhagen won the 2016 F1600 Championship Series. But as he was already qualified by winning the Runoffs, runner-up Peter Portante was awarded a place to compete.

 McCusker finished second in the 2016 F2000 Championship Series. The championship was won by Steve Bamford, a masters class competitor, ineligible because of his age.  Drivers must be between 14 and 25.

 Formula Car Challenge FormulaSpeed champion Sugianto won the shootout invitation over Formula Car Challenge Pro Formula Mazda champion Bruno Carneiro after a video competition.

 Brown finished second in the 2016 Australian Formula Ford championship.  The championship was won by Leanne Tander, ineligible because of her age (36).

 Tharani finished second in the MRF1600 (India) championship, but champion Vikash Anand is facing indictment for drunk driving from a September crash where Anand was driving under the influence, and thereby disqualified.

 Verhagen, McCusker and Norman all qualified, but were unable to attend due to prior commitments clashing with the shootout date.  Verhagen tested at the annual Road to Indy Chris Griffis Test at the Indianapolis Motor Speedway, scoring the fastest time in the test with Pabst Racing.  Norman signed with Andretti Autosport on December 5, 2016 to participate in Indy Lights for the 2017 season.

Mazda Road to Indy - Brasil
The 2016 Mazda Road to Indy - Brasil was a karting contest to qualify for the finals at Mazda Raceway Laguna Seca. The event was held at Kartódromo de Interlagos on 27 August 2016. The event was set up by former racing driver Paulo Carcasci. Eleven drivers from four different Brazilian states and the Federal District competed for a spot in the final at Laguna Seca.

Result

Format

Lucas Oil School of Racing supplied the 18 scholarship candidates with Formula Ford style cars. The Ray Race Cars GR-RSC was fitted with a 2 litre engine built by Elite Engines. All cars were shod with Cooper Tires. The Shootout started with orientation of the cars and the track on December 5. On the second day drivers were divided in four groups and took to the tracks. For the final Shootout day the group was again divided in four. After initial testing sessions the first drivers were eliminated. The remaining drivers started 30 minute qualifying sessions before the race over 30 minutes.

Competition
All participants participated in a vehicle orientation and then multiple practice sessions over two days, culminating in a pre-qualification session where six finalists would be chosen. Those finalists would then participate in a 30 minute qualifying session and a 30 minute race.

Winner
Oliver Askew was selected as the winner of the shootout and won a scholarship to compete in the 2017 U.S. F2000 National Championship.

References

2016
2016 in IndyCar
U.S. F2000 National Championship seasons